Edward Richard Buxton Shanks (11 June 1892 – 4 May 1953) was an English writer, known as a war poet of World War I, then as an academic and journalist, and literary critic and biographer. He also wrote some science fiction.

He was born in London, and educated at Merchant Taylors' School and Trinity College, Cambridge. He passed his B.A. in History in 1913. He was editor of Granta from 1912–13. He served in World War I with the British Army in France, but was invalided out in 1915, and did administrative work until war's end.

He was later a literary reviewer, working for the London Mercury (1919–22) and for a short while a lecturer at the University of Liverpool (1926). He was the chief leader-writer for the Evening Standard from 1928 to 1935.

The People of the Ruins (1920) was a science-fiction novel in which a man wakes after being put into suspended animation in 1924, to discover a devastated Britain 150 years in the future.  The People of the Ruins has an anti-communist subtext (the future 1924 is devastated by Marxist revolutionaries).

Awards and honors
He was the first recipient of the Hawthornden Prize in 1919.

Works
Songs (1915) poems
Hilaire Belloc, the man and his work (1916) with C. Creighton Mandell
Poems (1916)
The Queen of China and Other Poems (1919) poems
The Old Indispensables (1919) novel
The People of the Ruins (1920) novel Text at Project Gutenberg Australia
The Island of Youth and Other Poems (1921) poems
The Richest Man (1923) novel
First Essays on Literature (1923) criticism
Fête Galante (1923) opera libretto
Bernard Shaw (1924) criticism
The Shadowgraph and Other Poems (1925)
Collected Poems (1900–1925) (1926)
The Beggar's Ride (1926) drama
Second Essays on Literature (1927) criticism (W.Collins Sons & Co. Ltd., London)
Queer Street (1933)
The Enchanted Village (1933)(A sequel "Queer Street", however, this one more uncommon)
Poems 1912–1932 (1933)
Tom Tiddler's Ground (1934)
Old King Cole (1936) novel
Edgar Allan Poe (1937)
My England (1939)
Rudyard Kipling – A Study in Literature and Political Ideas (1940)
Poems 1939–1952 (1953)

Notes

Further reading
 Ross, Robert H. (1965). The Georgian Revolt, 1910–1922 : Rise and Fall of a Poetic Ideal, Carbondale : Southern Illinois University Press.

External links
 
 

1892 births
1953 deaths
English science fiction writers
English male journalists
People educated at Merchant Taylors' School, Northwood
Artists' Rifles soldiers
British male poets
English male novelists
20th-century English poets
20th-century English novelists
20th-century English male writers